The Gribskov Line or the Gribskov Railway is a local passenger railway line in North Zealand north of Copenhagen, Denmark.

The line runs north from Hillerød through the Gribskov forest and splits into two branches to the seaside resort towns of Tisvildeleje and Gilleleje. Connecting the wide belt of holiday homes along the northern coast of Zealand with Copenhagen is an important role of the Gribskov Line.

The railway is standard gauge and single track. It opened in various sections between 1880 and 1924.

The railway is currently owned by Hovedstadens Lokalbaner and operated by the railway company Lokaltog. Lokaltog runs frequent local train services from Hillerød station to Tisvildeleje station and Gilleleje station with most trains continuing from Gilleleje along the Hornbæk Line to Helsingør station.

History 

The railway opened in various sections between 1880 and 1924.

Route 

The line runs north from  where transfers from the S-train system as well as other Lokalbanen lines are possible, and through the Gribskov forest.

Operations

Trains on the Gribskov Line are operated by the railway company Lokaltog. Lokaltog operates a fairly intensive timetable on the Gribskov Line with light DMUs working a fixed 30-minute frequency most of the day. Most passengers connect from the Nordbanen S-trains at Hillerød.

Until late 2007, transfers to and from the Hornbæk Line were needed at Gilleleje, but after major changes to Gilleleje station, trains now operate through Gilleleje to Helsingør along the Hornbæk Line, eliminating the need to change at Gilleleje.

Heritage train

During the summer months of July and August, Nordsjællands Veterantog operates weekend steam trains on the Gribskov Line between Græsted and Gilleleje, continuing along coast on the Hornbæk Line to Grønnehave station in Helsingør. This has been a tradition since 1971.

Stations

 
 
 Kildeport (closed)

Tisvildeleje branch 
 
  (closed)

Gilleleje branch 
  (closed)
 
 
  (closed)

See also
 List of railway lines in Denmark
 The Hornbæk Line

Sources

References

External links

 Lokaltog
 Gribskovbanen on jernbanen.dk

Hovedstadens Lokalbaner
Railway lines in Denmark
Heinrich Wenck buildings
Railway lines opened in 1880
Rail transport in the Capital Region of Denmark